Ilchester is a village and civil parish in the county of Somerset, England.

Ilchester may also refer to:

United Kingdom
Ilchester (UK Parliament constituency), a former constituency in Somerset
Ilchester Cheese Company
Earl of Ilchester, a title in the Peerage of Great Britain

United States
Ilchester, Maryland, an unincorporated community near Baltimore

See also
Ilchester Friary
Ilchester Museum
Ilchester Nunnery
Richard of Ilchester (died 1188), medieval English statesman and prelate